George B. Radbourn (April 8, 1856 – January 1, 1904) was a Major League Baseball pitcher. In 3 career games, he had a 1–2 record with a 6.55 ERA.

Radbourn was born and died in Bloomington, Illinois.

External links

1856 births
1904 deaths
Detroit Wolverines players
Major League Baseball pitchers
Baseball players from Illinois
19th-century baseball players